Parmelia may refer to:
 Parmelia (barque), the vessel that in 1829 transported the first settlers of the British colony of Western Australia
 Parmelia (fungus), a genus of lichens with global distribution
 Parmelia, Western Australia, a suburb of Kwinana, Western Australia